Rhys Magin (born 4 March 1989) is an Australian rules football player who was on the rookie list in 2008 and 2009 for the Essendon Football Club in the Australian Football League.  He played junior football primarily in a half-forward flank position however it is noted he can play in both a forward and defensive role. He represented Queensland at the 2007 Under-18 Championships.

Prior to round 16 Magin was elevated off the rookie list to replace the injured Jason Winderlich Magin made his AFL debut in round 19 against West Coast Eagles.

Magin was delisted at the end of 2009.

Magin played with Essendon District Football League (EDFL) side Avondale Heights for the 2010 season with the club's new coach triple premiership player Chris Johnson.  In 2015 he joined Kyneton Football Club in the Bendigo Football League.

References

External links
 
 

Essendon Football Club players
Zillmere Eagles Australian Football Club players
Australian rules footballers from Queensland
1989 births
Living people
People from Nambour, Queensland